Roaring 40s is an electricity generator formed in 2005 as a joint venture between Hydro Tasmania, Australia and Hong Kong-based China Light & Power (CLP). Since the beginning in 2005, Roaring 40s has had 13 sites in operation or in planning in Australia, India, Hong Kong and mainland China. Cathedral Rocks, Woolnorth, Waterloo Wind Farm and Musselroe are four notable power plants that the company owns. 

Roaring 40s partnership will be splitting in June 2011 with the projects being divided between the two original partners, CLP and Hydro Tasmania.

See also

Cathedral Rocks Wind Farm

External links

Electric power companies of Australia